Unmasked may refer to:
 Unmasked (Kiss album), 1980
 Unmasked Tour, a 1980 concert tour by the hard rock group Kiss
 Unmasked (Ira Losco album)
 Unmasked (radio show), an American radio show
 Unmasked (Left Behind: The Kids), a book written by Jerry B. Jenkins and Tim LaHaye
 "Unmasked" (The Following), an episode of the TV series The Following
 Unmasked (1917 film), a film added to the United States National Film Registry in 2014
 Unmasked (1929 film), an American mystery film directed by Edgar Lewis
 Unmasked (1950 film), an American crime film
 "Unmasked" (Arrow), an episode of the television series Arrow
 "UnmAsked" (Pretty Little Liars), a 2012 episode of the television series Pretty Little Liars
 Unmasked: Two Confidential Interviews with Hitler in 1931
Unmasked: Inside Antifa’s Radical Plan to Destroy Democracy, 2021 book

See also
Unmasking by intelligence agencies